The Moore Haven Correctional Facility  is a private state prison for men located in Moore Haven, Glades County, Florida, which is operated by GEO Group under contract with the Florida Department of Corrections.  This facility was opened in 1995 and has a maximum capacity of 985 prisoners.

See also
 Glades County Detention Center

References

Prisons in Florida
Buildings and structures in Glades County, Florida
GEO Group
1995 establishments in Florida